West 57th can refer to:

West 57th Street (Manhattan) a street in New York City
West 57th (TV series), a news magazine program which aired on the CBS Television Network from 1985 to 1989